SNCF 150.P were a class of 2-10-0 “Decapod” steam locomotives built as standard locomotives of the newly created Société Nationale des Chemins de fer Français (SNCF) between April 1940 and April 1950

Origins 
The class were built by:
 Ateliers de construction du Nord de la France (ANF), Blanc-Misseron,
 Société Alsacienne de Constructions Mécaniques (SACM), Graffenstaden,
 Aciéries du Nord (ADN), Hautmont.

The 115 locomotives were delivered between 16 April 1940 and 15 April 1950. They were, in effect a continuation, with improvements, of a Nord design, Nord 5.1201 to 5.1230 (SNCF 2-150.B.1 to 30); they were ordered due to a shortage locomotives for heavy trains.

The first 50 locomotives were requisitioned by Germany for the Deutsche Reichsbahn, some as soon as they left the factory.  Three locomotives, 150.P.14, 40 and 49, were never returned; although it was April 1953 before they were struck off the roster. In addition, one locomotive, 150.P.19, was destroyed during World War II and written off in February 1945.

Service 
The locomotives were allocated to the SNCF's Nord Region, but after 1956, many were transferred to the Est Region for heavy coal, ore and steel trains as well as general freight.  On the Nord Region they were allocated to the following depots: Lens, Valenciennes, Longueau, Somain, Béthune, Le Bourget and Aulnoye. On the Est Region they were allocated to Chalindrey, then Chaumont.

As electrification spread on the Nord Region, 45 locomotives were transferred to Est Region.  The last Nord examples were 2-150.P.93 and 103 which were withdrawn on 17 March 1967, after only 18 years' service. On the Est Region they only lasted a few months longer; the last one, 1-150.P.86, was withdraw on 19 February 1968, after having worked .

Outside their allocated region, they also worked onto the Ouest Region with Longueau locomotives working Rouen to Amiens freights; and the Sud-Est Region with Chalindrey and Chaumont locomotives working Chalindrey to Dijon freights.

Only one locomotive has been preserved: 150.P.13, which was at the Cité du Train, but is now kept at the Mohon roundhouse.

Description 
The 150.P locomotives had chassis made of  plate steel, which gave great rigidity. The Decapods were a four-cylinder compound, with the two high-pressure cylinders outside and the two low-pressure cylinders inside; they were manufactured as a single moobloc casting. The valve gear was of the Walschaerts type, with the inside cylinders connected to the second pair of driving wheels, and the outside to the middle pair. The Belpaire firebox had a Nicholson thermic syphon; with a long and narrow grate.; the boiler was identical to those used on the 2-150.B locomotives. They had an HT1 mechanical stoker (except for 150.P.16 to 25 and 40 to 50). They were fitted with a variable Lemaître exhaust, and an ACFI feedwater heater The lead bissel truck was of the Nord pattern, with a lateral displacement of ±; it was also connected to the leading driving axle which had a lateral displacement of ±. They were fitted with smoke deflectors.

Tender 
These two designs differed only in the design of the coal bunker and were derived from the Nord's  tender. They were also used with the 241.P and 141.P classes. The locomotives that did not have the HT1 stoker were fitted with tenders holding  of water and 9 tonnes of coal; these were numbered 38.P.1 to 21.

Gallery 
150.P.13 was exhibited at the Grand Palais, Paris in an event titled "L'art entre en gare" to mark the 70th anniversary of the SNCF.

References 

Steam locomotives of France
2-10-0 locomotives
SNCF locomotives
SACM locomotives
Railway locomotives introduced in 1940
ANF locomotives
1′E h4v locomotives
Freight locomotives